Lepidobero is a monospecific genus of freshwater ray-finned fish belonging to the family Cottidae, the typical sculpins. Its only species is Lepidobero sinensis which is endemic to China. 

Lepidobero was first proposed as a genus in 1992 by the Chinese biologists in Qin Ke-Jing and Jin Xin-Bo when they described its only species Lepidobero sinensis with its type locality given as Hei-Shi-Jiao, Dalian in Liaoning. This taxon is placed in the family Cottidae by some authorities, while others place it in the subfamily Psychrolutinae of the family Psychrolutidae.

References

Cottinae
Monotypic fish genera
Freshwater fish of China
Fish described in 1992